East Gros Ventre Butte is a butte located at 43°29'04.8"N 110°46'46.6" northwest of Jackson, Wyoming. It is sometimes referred to as "Saddle Butte" by long-time residents of Jackson Hole.

References

Buttes of Wyoming
Landforms of Teton County, Wyoming